Dame Jilian Norma Matheson  (born 27 March 1953) is the former National Statistician of the United Kingdom.

Career
Matheson joined the Office of Population Censuses and Surveys in 1975. She worked on the Expenditure and Food Survey and the General Household Survey. After 1998 she worked on Neighbourhood Statistics. At the ONS, between 2004-08, she was the Director of Census, Demographic and Regional Statistics. 

She became Director General for Statistics Delivery at the ONS in 2008 with responsibility for the delivery of all ONS statistical operations and outputs, and for the development of the ONS’ statistical portfolio in consultation with users.

She has been elected a Fellow of the Academy of Social Sciences (FAcSS) in 2001, a member of the Social Research Association, and a Fellow of the Royal Statistical Society (FRSS).

National Statistician
Matheson succeeded Dame Karen Dunnell as National Statistician on 1 September 2009, and Chief Executive of the UK Statistics Authority (and the Office for National Statistics).
She retired from these roles on 30 June 2014. She was appointed Dame Commander of the Order of the Bath (DCB) in the 2014 Birthday Honours for services to government statistics.

See also
 Demography of the United Kingdom

References

External links
 More or Less September 2009

Fellows of the Academy of Social Sciences
Directors of the Office for National Statistics
Civil servants in the Office of Population Censuses and Surveys
1953 births
Living people
Women statisticians
Dames Commander of the Order of the Bath
British statisticians